Alan Stone may refer to:

Alan A. Stone (1929-2022), scholar of law and psychology at Harvard, and film critic
Alan Stone (opera director) (1929–2008), founder of the Chicago Opera Theater
Alan Stone (wrestler) (born 1977), Mexican professional wrestler

See also
 Allan Stone (born 1945), Australian tennis player
 Allen Stone (born 1987), American soul singer and musician